The Zambia Ladies Open is a women's professional golf tournament played in Zambia. 

The 2014 event, included on the Sunshine Ladies Tour, marked the first time that Zambia hosted a professional women's tournament. The field included players from Zambia, South Africa, England, Namibia, Swaziland, Sweden, Nigeria, Zimbabwe, Botswana, Kenya and Australia. It coincided with the 50th anniversary celebrations of the Zambia Ladies Golf Union.

Winners

See also
Zambia Open

References

External links
Coverage on the Sunshine Ladies Tour's official site

Sunshine Ladies Tour events
Golf tournaments in Zambia